This is a list of 147 species in Isonychus, a genus of May beetles and junebugs in the family Scarabaeidae.

Isonychus species

 Isonychus aenescens Moser, 1919 c g
 Isonychus aequatorialis Moser, 1924 c g
 Isonychus albicinctus (Mannerheim, 1829) c g
 Isonychus albofasciatus Blanchard, 1850 c g
 Isonychus albosignatus Moser, 1921 c g
 Isonychus alienus Frey, 1970 c g
 Isonychus angosturanus Moser, 1924 c g
 Isonychus arbusticola Erichson, 1847 c g
 Isonychus argentinus Moser, 1919 c g
 Isonychus arizonensis Howden, 1959 i c g b
 Isonychus bahianus Frey, 1974 c g
 Isonychus bimaculatus Burmeister, 1855 c g
 Isonychus bistrigus Burmeister, 1855 c g
 Isonychus bivittatus Burmeister, 1855 c g
 Isonychus boliviensis Moser, 1918 c g
 Isonychus braumeisteri Frey, 1969 c g
 Isonychus bruchiformis (Germar, 1813) c g
 Isonychus burmeisteri Von Dalle Torre, 1912 c g
 Isonychus callosipygus Frey, 1965 c g
 Isonychus castaneus Burmeister, 1855 c g
 Isonychus catharinae Blanchard, 1850 c g
 Isonychus caudiculatus Moser, 1918 c g
 Isonychus cervicapra Frey, 1965 c g
 Isonychus cervinalis Frey, 1965 c g
 Isonychus cervinodes Frey, 1965 c g
 Isonychus cervinus Erichson, 1847 c g
 Isonychus chacoensis Moser, 1918 c g
 Isonychus chiriquinus Bates, 1887 c g
 Isonychus cinereus Blanchard, 1850 c g
 Isonychus costaricensis Moser, 1918 c g
 Isonychus crinitus Blanchard, 1850 c g
 Isonychus denudatus Blanchard, 1850 c g
 Isonychus discolor Moser, 1924 c g
 Isonychus egregius Frey, 1965 c g
 Isonychus elegans Blanchard, 1850 c g
 Isonychus elongatus Frey, 1965 c g
 Isonychus erectepilosus Frey, 1970 c g
 Isonychus fasciatipennis Moser, 1924 c g
 Isonychus fasciolatus Blanchard, 1850 c g
 Isonychus flaviventris Moser, 1921 c g
 Isonychus flavopilosus Moser, 1921 c g
 Isonychus fraternus Moser, 1918 c g
 Isonychus fraudulentus Frey, 1969 c g
 Isonychus fulvescens Blanchard, 1850 c g
 Isonychus fulvipennis Moser, 1921 c g
 Isonychus fuscipennis Blanchard, 1850 c g
 Isonychus gracilipes Blanchard, 1850 c g
 Isonychus gracilis Burmeister, 1855 c g
 Isonychus granarius Burmeister, 1855 c g
 Isonychus granuliventris Frey, 1970 c g
 Isonychus griseolus Moser, 1921 c g
 Isonychus griseopilosus Moser, 1921 c g
 Isonychus griseus Mannerheim, 1829 c g
 Isonychus guayanensis Frey, 1970 c g
 Isonychus hiekei Frey, 1965 c g
 Isonychus hirsutus Bates, 1887 c g
 Isonychus kulzeri Frey, 1967 c g
 Isonychus kuntzeni Moser, 1921 c g
 Isonychus laevipygus Frey, 1964 c g
 Isonychus leechi Frey, 1969 c g
 Isonychus limbatus Burmeister, 1855 c g
 Isonychus lindemannae Frey, 1974 c g
 Isonychus lineatus Burmeister, 1855 c g
 Isonychus lineola Blanchard, 1850 c g
 Isonychus lituratus Blanchard, 1850 c g
 Isonychus lojanus Frey, 1967 c g
 Isonychus maculatus Waterhouse, 1874 c g
 Isonychus maculipennis Moser, 1918 c g
 Isonychus marmoratus Blanchard, 1850 c g
 Isonychus marmoreus Burmeister, 1855 c g
 Isonychus microsquamosus Frey, 1970 c g
 Isonychus minutus (Fabricius, 1801) c g
 Isonychus murinus Blanchard, 1850 c g
 Isonychus mus Burmeister, 1855 c g
 Isonychus mutans Frey, 1970 c g
 Isonychus neglectus Moser, 1918 c g
 Isonychus nigripes Moser, 1921 c g
 Isonychus nitens Moser, 1921 c g
 Isonychus nitidus Burmeister, 1855 c g
 Isonychus nubeculus Frey, 1969 c g
 Isonychus nubilus Burmeister, 1855 c g
 Isonychus nudipennis Frey, 1967 c g
 Isonychus obesulus Burmeister, 1855 c g
 Isonychus oblongoguttatus Moser, 1921 c g
 Isonychus oblongomaculatus Moser, 1921 c g
 Isonychus obsoletus Blanchard, 1850 c g
 Isonychus ocellatus Burmeister, 1855 c g
 Isonychus ochraceus Blanchard, 1850 c g
 Isonychus ohausi Moser, 1921 c g
 Isonychus ornatipennis Moser, 1921 c g
 Isonychus ovinus Erichson, 1847 c g
 Isonychus paganus Blanchard, 1850 c g
 Isonychus paradoxus Bates, 1887 c g
 Isonychus parallelus Frey, 1970 c g
 Isonychus paranus Moser, 1921 c g
 Isonychus parvulus Moser, 1918 c g
 Isonychus pauloensis Frey, 1970 c g
 Isonychus pavonii Erichson, 1847 c g
 Isonychus penai Frey, 1966 c g
 Isonychus pereirai Frey, 1970 c g
 Isonychus peruanus Moser, 1921 c g
 Isonychus phlaeopterus Blanchard, 1850 c g
 Isonychus pictus Sharp, 1877 c g
 Isonychus pilicollis Moser, 1924 c g
 Isonychus pilosus Evans, 2003 c g
 Isonychus piperitus Bates, 1887 c g
 Isonychus podicalis Moser, 1918 c g
 Isonychus politus Burmeister, 1855 c g
 Isonychus prasinus Nonfried, 1891 c g
 Isonychus psittacinus Dejean, 1836 c g
 Isonychus pulchellus Moser, 1918 c g
 Isonychus religiosus Evans, 2003 c g
 Isonychus rosettae Frey, 1969 c g
 Isonychus rugicollis Burmeister, 1855 c g
 Isonychus saltanus Frey, 1969 c g
 Isonychus saylori Frey, 1969 c g
 Isonychus schneblei Frey, 1964 c g
 Isonychus scutellaris Moser, 1918 c g
 Isonychus setifer Moser, 1918 c g
 Isonychus similis Frey, 1973 c g
 Isonychus simplex Frey, 1976 c g
 Isonychus simulator Frey, 1969 c g
 Isonychus soricinus Blanchard, 1850 c g
 Isonychus squamifer Blanchard, 1850 c g
 Isonychus squamulosus Frey, 1970 c g
 Isonychus striatipennis Moser, 1918 c g
 Isonychus striolatus Frey, 1970 c g
 Isonychus submaculatus Moser, 1921 c g
 Isonychus sulcicollis Moser, 1921 c g
 Isonychus sulphureus Mannerheim, 1829 c g
 Isonychus suturalis Mannerheim, 1829 c g
 Isonychus tessellatus Burmeister, 1855 c g
 Isonychus tomentosus Burmeister, 1855 c g
 Isonychus unicolor Blanchard, 1850 c g
 Isonychus unidens Frey, 1972 c g
 Isonychus uniformis Moser, 1920 c g
 Isonychus ursus Moser, 1918 c g
 Isonychus varians Blanchard, 1850 c g
 Isonychus variegatus (Germar, 1824) c g
 Isonychus variipennis Moser, 1918 c g
 Isonychus ventralis Moser, 1921 c g
 Isonychus vestitus (Castelnau, 1840) c g
 Isonychus vicinus Moser, 1918 c g
 Isonychus vittatus Burmeister, 1855 c g
 Isonychus vittiger Blanchard, 1850 c g
 Isonychus vittipennis Moser, 1921 c g
 Isonychus zikani Moser, 1921 c g

Data sources: i = ITIS, c = Catalogue of Life, g = GBIF, b = Bugguide.net

References

Isonychus
Articles created by Qbugbot